The Wildstorm Thunderbook is a comic book anthology that was published by DC Comics/Wildstorm in 2000.

Stories

This prestige format one-shot relaunched a few characters such as Cybernary 2.0 and Jet, and featured the following stories:

 Wham! (Gen¹³)
 Professionals (Grifter)
 Family Matters (Jet)
 Return to Gamorra (Cybernary 2.0)
 Down and Out with the Deviants (DV8)

References

External links
 Thunderbook preview from ComicBookResources.com
 Thunder In A Honey Pot - commentary from the editor

2000 comics debuts
DC Comics one-shots
WildStorm limited series